The Cumbria League Cup is an annual rugby union knockout club competition organized by the Cumbria Rugby Union.  It was first introduced during the 2011-12 season and the inaugural winners were Keswick.  It is the second most important cup competition in Cumbria, behind the Cumbria Cup but ahead of the Cumbria Shield.  

The Cumbria League Cup is currently open to club sides playing at tier 8 (Cumbria League) of the English rugby union league system.  The present format is a knockout cup with a preliminary round, first round, semi-finals and final to be held at a neutral venue in April-May.

Cumbria League Cup winners

Number of wins
Keswick (2)
Egremont (1)
Furness (1)
Silloth (1)
Whitehaven (1)

Notes

See also
 Cumbria Rugby Union
 Cumbria Cup
 Cumbria Shield
 Westmorland & Furness Cup

References

External links
 Cumbria RU

Recurring sporting events established in 2011
2011 establishments in England
Rugby union cup competitions in England
Rugby union in Cumbria